SS John Miller was a Liberty ship built in the United States during World War II. She was named after John Miller, a Merchant seaman killed on the Liberty ship , 9 July 1943, when she was

Construction
John Miller was laid down on 7 December 1944, under a Maritime Commission (MARCOM) contract, MC hull 2515, by the St. Johns River Shipbuilding Company, Jacksonville, Florida; she was sponsored by Mrs. Margie Knight, the sister of the namesake, and she was launched on 15 January 1945.

History
She was allocated to the Isbrandstsen Steamship Co., Inc., on 15 January 1945. On 23 August 1949, she was laid up in the National Defense Reserve Fleet, Beaumont, Texas. She was sold for scrapping, 3 December 1970, to Luria Bros. & Co., for $40,100. She was removed from the fleet, 17 February 1971.

References

Bibliography

 
 
 
 
 

 

Liberty ships
Ships built in Jacksonville, Florida
1945 ships
Beaumont Reserve Fleet